Claude Henri Maurice Barrès (22 March 1925 – 26 May 1959) was a French Army officer that in World War II, First Indochina War, Korean War and Algerian War. He was the grandson of author Maurice Barrès and son of journalist Philippe Barrès.

Biography
He joined the Free French Forces during World War II at the age of seventeen as a paratrooper in the SAS. He then fought in the First Indochina War, Korean War and Algerian War. He was killed while leading his company, 5th Company of the 9th Parachute Chasseur Regiment, at Djebel Harraba near the Algerian-Tunisian border.

Decorations
Commander of the Légion d’honneur
Médaille militaire
Croix de guerre 1939-1945 with palm
He received thirteen citations during his career.

1925 births
1959 deaths
People from Vosges (department)
French military personnel of World War II
French military personnel of the First Indochina War
French military personnel of the Korean War
French military personnel of the Algerian War
French Army officers
Recipients of the Croix de Guerre 1939–1945 (France)
Commandeurs of the Légion d'honneur
French military personnel killed in the Algerian War
Barrès family